Goonabarn is a hamlet in the parish of St Stephen-in-Brannel, Cornwall, England.

References

Hamlets in Cornwall